Dindga McCannon, born July 31, 1947, is an African-American artist, fiber artist, muralist, teacher author and illustrator.

Early life and education 
McCannon was born and raised in Harlem and was inspired to become an artist at the age of 10. She is self-taught and works intuitively. Calling herself a mixed-media, a multimedia artist she works at "fusing my fine art 'training' with the traditional women's needlework taught to me by my mother, Lottie K. Porter, and grandmother Hattie Kilgo — sewing, beading, embroidery, and quilting into what is now known as ArtQuilts."

Career 
Dindga McCannon has been an artist for 55 years. In addition to her work as a quilter author, and illustrator, Dindga considers herself a costume designer and muralist and a print maker. Her work involves women's lives, portraits, and history.

In response to sexism and racism in the art world, artists in the 1960s and 1970s created collectives as a way to fight oppression. In the 1960s McCannon was a member of Weusi Artist Collective. This is how McCannon became interested in the Black Arts Movement. The Weusi Collective was interested in creating art that evoked African themes and symbols, as well as highlighting contemporary black pride. In 1971, she hosted the first meeting of the Where We At group of black women artists in her apartment, which grew into one of the first group show of professional black women artists in New York City.

McCannon's interest in black arts and women's work met in her creation of dashikis, which then led her to create wearables and quilts.

In 2015 she was a presenter at the Art of Justice: Articulating an Ethos and Aesthetic of the Movement conference at New York University presented by the Caribbean Cultural Center African Diaspora Institute in Collaboration with the Department of Art and Public Policy, New York University; Institute of African American Affairs, New York University; and Institute for Research in African American Studies, Columbia University.

Her image is included in the iconic 1972 poster  Some Living American Women Artists by Mary Beth Edelson.

Artworks
McCannon has a quilt (titled "Yekk's Song") in the permanent collection of the Schomburg Center for Research in Black Culture. In January 2020 McCannon's oil painting, "The Last Farewell" was auctioned for $161,000 as part of Johnson Publishing Company's bankruptcy proceedings. This work was part of their private collection, which also included works by Henry Ossawa Tanner and Carrie Mae Weems.

"Revolutionary Sister", a mixed media work created in 1971, was created in response to a lack of revolutionary women warriors. The work depicts a powerful and colorful sister, created in part with items from the hardware store. McCannon speaks about this piece as a Statue of Liberty figure. It is in the permanent collection of the Brooklyn Museum.

Exhibitions

One-woman shows
In 2009, McCannon had a one-woman exhibition titled "(This) Woman's Work is Never Done — Celebrating 44 years of Art Making." It was featured at the Hamilton Landmark Galleries, 467 West 144th Street in Harlem.

In 2021 she had a solo show at the Fridman Gallery gallery entitled In Plain Sight.

McCannon's work has appeared in many group shows since 1971.

Selected group shows

2001: “Spirits of the Cloth,” Contemporary Quilts by African American Artists, American Craft Museum, NY
2002: “Spirits of the Cloth,” Renwick Gallery at the Smithsonian Institution, Washington DC.
2003: “America from the Heart,” Hudson River Museum, NY
2004: “America from the Heart: Quilters Remember 9/11”, Page–Walker Art and History Center, Cary, NC
2008: Weusi Collective: A Retrospective of 50 Years, African American Museum of Nassau County, NY
2009: “Textural Rhythms: Quilting the Jazz Tradition,” American Folk Art Museum, NYC
2010: “Weusi Revisited 2010,” Dwyer Cultural Center, NY
2017:-2018: "We Wanted A Revolution: Black Radical Women 1965-1985"
Brooklyn Museum, NY
CAAM, Los Angeles, CA
Albright Knox Gallery, Buffalo, NY
ICA Boston, MA
2020: "Forget What You Know", Kourosh Mahboubian Fine Art, NYC

Commissions
McCannon has also been commissioned to create various pieces of art.

1985: “United Community,” 50 ft by 6 stories, 25 Furman Ave, Brooklyn, NY, Dept of Cultural Affairs
2000: “Amazing Life of Althea Gibson,” 60 inches by 120 inches art story quilt, Disney Inc for ESPN Zone, 42nd Street and Brady, NYC
2001: “Winning the Vote,” Art Quilt on the Pioneers of Wome's voting history America, Scholastic Magazine
2008: “Zora Neale Hurston,” B.O.S.S. (Barnard Organization of Soul Sisters), Columbia University, NY

Collections

Johnson Publishing Company, Studio Museum in Harlem Permanent Collection
Schomberg Center for Research in Black Culture, Harlem NY, Arts in Embassies Program, Washington, DC
Brooklyn Museum Collection

Awards

2005 – N. Y. F. A. Fellowship – Crafts
2007 – Urban Artists Initiative, Harlem Arts Alliance
2008 – Northern Manhattan Arts Alliance – Individual Artists Grant 2009 – Northern Manhattan Arts Alliance – Individual Artist Grant

Books 
McCannon has written and illustrated two books. Peaches, published by Lothrop, Lee & Shepard in 1974 and by Dell in 1977, tells the story of a young black girl growing up in Harlem, her life with her family and her ambition to be an artist.

Wilhemina Jones, Future Star, published by Delacorte in 1980, has a similar theme, with a young black girl growing up in Harlem in the mid-1960s who dreams of pursuing an art career and leaving the oppressive atmosphere of her home.

McCannon has also illustrated books for others: Omar at X-mas by Edgar White, Lothrop, Lee & Shepard, and Speak to the Winds, African Proverbs, written by K. O. Opuku, published by Lothrop, Lee & Shepard in 1972.

In 2018 McCannon published an illustrated cookbook called Celebrations. The opening reception was held at Art For the Soul Gallery in Springfield, MA.

Memberships 
McCannon was a member of two artist's collectives, Weusi and Where We At (a black woman's collective from the 1970s).

Further reading

References

1947 births
Living people
American textile artists
Quilters
African-American women artists
People from Harlem
Artists from New York City
20th-century American artists
20th-century American women artists
21st-century American artists
21st-century American women artists
20th-century women textile artists
20th-century textile artists
21st-century women textile artists
21st-century textile artists
20th-century African-American women
20th-century African-American artists
21st-century African-American women
21st-century African-American artists